Peyper is a surname. Notable people with the surname include:

Brendan Peyper (born 1996), South African Afrikaans singer
Jaco Peyper (born 1980), South African rugby referee

See also
Almut Lehmann, married name Almut Peyper (born 1953), German pair skater
Pepper (name)
Peyer